Great Ormond Street Hospital (informally GOSH or Great Ormond Street, formerly the Hospital for Sick Children) is a children's hospital located in the Bloomsbury area of the London Borough of Camden, and a part of Great Ormond Street Hospital for Children NHS Foundation Trust.

The hospital is the largest centre for child heart surgery in the UK and one of the largest centres for heart transplantation in the world. In 1962 they developed the first heart and lung bypass machine for children. With children's book author Roald Dahl, they developed an improved shunt valve for children with hydrocephalus, and non-invasive (percutaneous) heart valve replacements. They did the first UK clinical trials of the rubella vaccine, and the first bone marrow transplant and gene therapy for severe combined immunodeficiency.

It is closely associated with University College London (UCL) and in partnership with the UCL Great Ormond Street Institute of Child Health, which is adjacent to it, is the largest centre for research and postgraduate teaching in children's health in Europe.

In 1929, J. M. Barrie donated the copyright to Peter Pan to the hospital.

History

Origins

The Hospital for Sick Children was founded on 14 February 1852 after a long campaign by Dr. Charles West, and was the first hospital in England to provide in-patient beds specifically for children.

Despite opening with just 10 beds, it grew into one of the world's leading children's hospitals through the patronage of Queen Victoria, counting Charles Dickens, a personal friend of the Chief Physician Dr West, as one of its first fundraisers. The Nurses League was formed in February 1937.

Nationalisation
Great Ormond Street Hospital was nationalised in 1948, becoming part of the National Health Service. During the early years of the NHS, private fundraising for the hospital was heavily restricted, though the hospital was permitted to continue to receive pre-existing legacies.

Audrey Callaghan, wife of James Callaghan (prime minister of the United Kingdom from 1976 to 1979), served the hospital as Chairman of the Board of Governors from 1968 to 1972 and then as Chairman of the Special Trustees from 1983 until her final retirement in 1990. Diana, Princess of Wales, served as president of the hospital from 1989 until her death. A plaque at the entrance of the hospital commemorates her services.

1990s
The Charles West School of Nursing transferred from Great Ormond Street to London South Bank University in 1995.

2000s
In 2002 Great Ormond Street Hospital commenced a redevelopment programme which is budgeted at £343 million and the next phase of which was scheduled to be complete by the end of 2016. In July 2012, Great Ormond Street Hospital was featured in the opening ceremony of the London Summer Olympics.

In 2017 Great Ormond Street Hospital was subject to international attention regarding the Charlie Gard treatment controversy.

Archives
The hospital's archives  are available for research under the terms of the Public Records Act 1958 and a catalogue is available on request. Admission records from 1852 to 1914 have been made available online on the Historic Hospital Admission Records Project.

St. Christopher's Chapel

St. Christopher's Chapel is a chapel decorated in the Byzantine style and Grade II* listed building located in the Variety Club Building of the hospital. Designed by Edward Middleton Barry (son of the architect Sir Charles Barry who designed the Houses of Parliament) and built in 1875, it is dedicated to the memory of Caroline Barry, wife of William Henry Barry (eldest son of Sir Charles Barry) who provided the £40,000 required to build the chapel and a stipend for the chaplain. It was built in "elaborate Franco-Italianate style". As the chapel exists to provide pastoral care to ill children and their families, many of its details refer to childhood. The stained glass depicts the Nativity, the childhood of Christ and biblical scenes related to children. The dome depicts a pelican pecking at her breast in order to feed her young with drops of her own blood, a traditional symbol of Christ's sacrifice for humanity.

When the old hospital was being demolished in the late 1980s, the chapel was moved to its present location via a 'concrete raft' to prevent any damage en route. The stained glass and furniture were temporarily removed for restoration and repair. It was reopened along with the new Variety Club Building on 14 February 1994 by Diana, Princess of Wales, then president of the hospital.

Peter Pan

In April 1929 J.M. Barrie gave the copyright to his Peter Pan works to the hospital, with the request that the income from this source not be disclosed. This gave the institution control of the rights to these works, and entitled it to royalties from any performance or publication of the play and derivative works. Innumerable performances of the play and its various adaptations have been staged, several theatrical and television adaptations have also been produced, and numerous editions of the novel have been published, all under licence from the hospital. The hospital's trustees further commissioned a sequel novel, Peter Pan in Scarlet, written by Geraldine McCaughrean and published in 2006.

After the copyright first expired in the UK at the end of 1987 – 50 years after Barrie's death – the UK government's Copyright, Designs and Patents Act of 1988 granted the hospital a perpetual right to collect royalties for public performances and commercial publication of the work within the UK. This did not grant GOSH full copyright control over the work, however. When UK copyright terms were later extended to the author's life plus 70 years by a European Union directive in 1996, GOSH revived its full copyright claim on the work. After the copyright expired again in 2007, the terms of the Copyright, Designs and Patents Act again applied.

At various times, GOSH has been in legal disputes in the United States, where the copyright term is based on date of publication, putting the 1911 novel in the public domain since the 1960s. The hospital asserts that the 1928 version of the play is still under copyright in the US.

Great Ormond Street Hospital Children's Charity
The hospital has relied on charitable support since it first opened.
One of the main sources for this support is Great Ormond Street Hospital Children's Charity. Whilst the NHS meets the day-to-day running costs of the hospital, the fundraising income allows Great Ormond Street Hospital to remain at the forefront of child healthcare. The charity aims to raise over £50 million every year to complete the next two phases of redevelopment, as well as provide substantially more fundraising directly for research. The charity also purchases up-to-date equipment, and provides accommodation for families and staff.

Great Ormond Street Hospital Children's Charity was one of the charities that benefited from the national Jeans for Genes campaign, which encourages people across the UK to wear their jeans and make a donation to help children affected by genetic disorders. All Great Ormond Street Hospital Charity's proceeds from the campaign went to its research partner, the UCL Institute of Child Health.

On 6 August 2009, Arsenal F.C. confirmed that Great Ormond Street Hospital Children's Charity was to be their 'charity of the season' for the 2009–10 season. They raised over £800,000 for a new lung function unit at the hospital.

Two charity singles have been released in aid of the hospital. In 1987, "The Wishing Well", recorded by an ensemble line-up including Boy George, Peter Cox and Dollar amongst others became a top 30 hit. In 2009, The X Factor finalists covered Michael Jackson's "You Are Not Alone" in aid of the charity, reaching No.1 in the UK Charts.

On 30 March 2010, Channel 4 staged the first Channel 4's Comedy Gala at the O2 Arena in London, in aid of the charity. The event has been repeated every year since, raising money for Great Ormond Street Hospital Children's Charity each time.

In 2011, Daniel Boys recorded a charity single called 'The World Is Something You Can Imagine'. It was also released as with proceeds going to the Disney Appeal at Great Ormond Street Hospital.

In 2018, celebrity supergroup The Celebs formed at Metropolis Studios to record an original Christmas song called "Rock With Rudolph", written and produced by Grahame and Jack Corbyn.  The song was in aid of Great Ormond Street Hospital. It was released digitally through independent record label Saga Entertainment in November 2018. The music video debuted exclusively with The Sun on 29 November 2018 and had its first TV showing on Good Morning Britain on 30 November 2018. The song peaked at number two on the iTunes pop chart.

Notable staff 
 Sir Lancelot Barrington-Ward, surgeon
 Mildred Creak, child psychiatrist
 Dr. Norman Bethune, Canadian physician and humanitarian
 Gwendoline Kirby, matron
 H. S. Sington, anaesthetist 1907 to 1938
  Lewis Spitz, surgeon

See also
 Healthcare in London
 List of hospitals in England
 Evelina London Children's Hospital, London, UK
 Necker-Enfants Malades Hospital, Paris, France
 Hospital for Sick Children, Toronto, Ontario

References

External links

 Great Ormond Street Hospital website
 MUSIC4GOSH Musicians working for Great Ormond Street Hospital Charity
 UCL Institute of Child Health website
 Jeans for Genes website
 Great Ormond Street Hospital Children's Charity (GOSHCC)
 Historic Hospital Admission Records Project – containing archive of admission records for The Hospital for Sick Children at Great Ormond Street 1852–1914
 Great Ormond Street Hospital Children's Nurses League website

 
Hospital buildings completed in 1852
Hospitals established in 1852
Children's hospitals in the United Kingdom
NHS hospitals in London
Buildings and structures in Bloomsbury
Health in the London Borough of Camden
1852 establishments in England
Peter Pan